The 1993 Country Music Association Awards, 27th Ceremony, was held on September 29, 1993 at the Grand Ole Opry House, Nashville, Tennessee, and was hosted by CMA Award Winners, Clint Black and Vince Gill.

Winners and Nominees 
Winner are in Bold.

Performers

Presenters

Hall of Fame

References 

Country Music Association
CMA
Country Music Association Awards
Country Music Association Awards
Country Music Association Awards
Country Music Association Awards
20th century in Nashville, Tennessee
Events in Nashville, Tennessee